Jennifer Madeleine Gilruth (born 1984) is a Scottish National Party (SNP) politician who has been the Member of the Scottish Parliament (MSP) for Mid Fife and Glenrothes since 2016. She has served in the Scottish Government as Minister for Transport since January 2022, having previously been a junior Minister for Europe and International Development from 2020 to 2022.

Early life and career
Gilruth was first raised in Banff, Aberdeenshire, before her family moved to Ceres, Fife. Her father was born and raised in Newport-on-Tay. She was educated at Madras College (St Andrews, Fife) and lives in Markinch. She graduated from the University of Glasgow with a degree in sociology and politics, and obtained her Professional Graduate Diploma in Education from the University of Strathclyde.

Before becoming an MSP, Gilruth was a Principal Teacher of Social Subjects at St. Columba's Roman Catholic High School, Dunfermline, she was previously a National Qualifications Development Officer at Education Scotland, and prior to that taught Modern Studies at the Royal High School, in Edinburgh. Gilruth also marked exams for the Scottish Qualifications Authority and is a published author.

Political career
In April 2016, Gilruth was nominated as the SNP’s candidate for Mid Fife and Glenrothes in the Scottish Parliament election on 5 May 2016. She won the seat with 15,555 votes (54.9% of the vote), with a majority of 8,236; more than double the votes cast for second-place candidate Kay Morrison of Scottish Labour. She succeeded Tricia Marwick, who had been the Presiding Officer in the 4th Scottish Parliament (2011–16).

In February 2020, Gilruth joined the Scottish Government as Minister for Europe, Migration and International Development as part of the reshuffle following the resignation of Cabinet Secretary for Finance Derek Mackay.

Minister for Transport
In a ministerial reshuffle on 24 January 2022, Gilruth was appointed as Minister for Transport, following the resignation of Graeme Dey. She said: "The transport portfolio is an exciting opportunity to not just shape the infrastructure of our country but to also help Scotland become a world leader in achieving our goal to become net zero by 2045." Since becoming Transport Minister, she has been involved in managing issues related to ScotRail train services and a dispute with ASLEF, as well as responsibilities relating to the provision of Scottish ferries. In June 2022, she responded to questions in the Scottish Parliament about her accountability and responsibility in resolving the ScotRail/ASLEF pay dispute.

Personal life
On 15 July 2017, it was announced Gilruth was in a relationship with Kezia Dugdale, who was, at that time, Leader of the Scottish Labour Party. In June 2022, Gilruth and Dugdale married in a private ceremony.

References

External links 
 
 profile on SNP website
 personal website

1984 births
Living people
Place of birth missing (living people)
People educated at Madras College
Alumni of the University of Glasgow
Scottish schoolteachers
Ministers of the Scottish Government
Scottish National Party MSPs
Members of the Scottish Parliament 2016–2021
Members of the Scottish Parliament 2021–2026
Female members of the Scottish Parliament
Lesbian politicians
LGBT members of the Scottish Parliament